The 22939/22940 Hapa - Bilaspur Superfast Express is a Superfast train belonging to Western Railway zone that runs between Hapa and Bilaspur Junction in India. It is currently being operated with 22939/22940 train numbers on a weekly basis.

Coach composition

The train has standard ICF rakes with max speed of 110 kmph. The train consists of 23 coaches :

 1 AC II Tier
 5 AC III Tier
 11 Sleeper 
 4 General Unreserved
 2 Seating cum Luggage Rake

Service

The 22939/Hapa - Bilaspur Superfast Express has an average speed of 58 km/hr and covers 1693 km in 29 hrs 05 mins.

The 22940/Bilaspur - Hapa Superfast Express has an average speed of 59 km/hr and covers 1693 km in 28 hrs 45 mins.

Route and halts 

The important halts of the train are:

Schedule

Traction

Both trains are hauled by a Vatva Loco Shed based WDM 3A diesel locomotive from Hapa to Ahmedabad. From Ahmedabad trains are hauled by a Vadodara Loco Shed based WAP-4E electric locomotive uptil Bilaspur and vice versa.

Rake sharing 

The train shares its rake with 19575/19576 Okha - Nathdwara Express.

Notes

See also 

 Hapa railway station
 Bilaspur Junction railway station
 Okha - Nathdwara Express

References

External links 

 22939/Hapa - Bilaspur Superfast Express
 22940/Bilaspur - Hapa Superfast Express

Transport in Jamnagar
Transport in Bilaspur, Chhattisgarh
Express trains in India
Rail transport in Gujarat
Rail transport in Maharashtra
Rail transport in Chhattisgarh
Railway services introduced in 2014